Aramoho is a settlement on the Whanganui River, in the Whanganui District and Manawatū-Whanganui region of New Zealand's North Island. It is an outlying suburb of Whanganui.

History

The settlement was established on the river in the 1860s, upstream from the European Wanganui settlement and the Māori Pūtiki settlement. A school was established in 1873.

A rail bridge at Aramoho, on the Marton–New Plymouth line, was completed in 1877.

In the early 20th century, families would travel up the river on a paddle steamer for an annual picnic at Hipango Park. Parents also raised money for a school pool, where generations of children learned to swim.

The National Library of New Zealand holds a photograph of school students and staff from 1915, showing boys wearing shorts, long socks, ties and blazers, and girls wearing dresses, on a small field in front of a school house. Another photo of children at the school featured in the New Zealand Railways Magazine in 1937.

A rose garden was planted near the school after World War I who commemorate locals who had died in the war. The garden later became a memorial to all pupils and teachers who had died in both world wars.

In 1926, Kempthorne Prosser opened a drug and fertiliser factory in Aramoho. It has since been used as a fertiliser plant and a medical centre.

In the 1930s, the Duchess Theatre or Duck Theatre began showing films. It later became the Aramoho Plaza.

The suburb expanded after World War II with a meatworks, a pickle factory, tea gardens, a fruit evaporating company, a zoo, and various hotels and boarding houses.

Demographics

It had a population of 3,966 at the 2018 New Zealand census, an increase of 273 people (7.4%) since the 2013 census, and unchanged since the 2006 census. There were 1,587 households. There were 1,899 males and 2,070 females, giving a sex ratio of 0.92 males per female, with 843 people (21.3%) aged under 15 years, 717 (18.1%) aged 15 to 29, 1,692 (42.7%) aged 30 to 64, and 714 (18.0%) aged 65 or older.

Ethnicities were 76.9% European/Pākehā, 31.8% Māori, 3.6% Pacific peoples, 2.6% Asian, and 1.4% other ethnicities (totals add to more than 100% since people could identify with multiple ethnicities).

The proportion of people born overseas was 9.8%, compared with 27.1% nationally.

Although some people objected to giving their religion, 52.2% had no religion, 31.6% were Christian, 0.2% were Hindu, 0.2% were Muslim, 0.4% were Buddhist and 6.7% had other religions.

Of those at least 15 years old, 363 (11.6%) people had a bachelor or higher degree, and 849 (27.2%) people had no formal qualifications. The employment status of those at least 15 was that 1,287 (41.2%) people were employed full-time, 441 (14.1%) were part-time, and 222 (7.1%) were unemployed.

Education

The original Aramaho School was established in 1973 and closed in 2016 due to an aging local population and the growth of kohanga reo and other schools. The Education Review Office had raised several concerns about how the school was being managed before its closure.

The Born and Raised Pasifika preschool was established on part of the Aramoho School site in 2003.

The Holy Infancy School opened in Aramoho in 1889 to provide Catholic education, becoming known as Sister Rita's School for the sister who ran the school for 40 years. It was renamed St Joseph's School in 1966, became an intermediate school for girls in 1970, and finally closed in 1979.

Marae

Te Ao Hou Marae is located in Aramoho, across the road from Churton School. It is a tribal meeting ground of Ngāti Tupoho, and the Ngāti Rangi hapū of Ngāti Rangi-ki-tai.

The marae occupies a section of Māori freehold land on the banks of the Whanganui River that was originally a summer fishing and food gathering place for the Ngāti Rangi people. A meeting house, called Te Puawaitanga, was built at the site in the 1970s. The blessing of the completed marae was photographed by Ans Westra in 1978.

Homes and toilets were later added to the site. In 2019, the marae trust applied for Government funding to expand its meeting house so it wouldn't need to put up tents for tangihanga and other special events.

The marae marks the downstream end point for Tira Hoe Waka, an annual pilgrimage in which participants paddle waka between marae on the Whanganui River.

References 

Suburbs of Whanganui
Settlements on the Whanganui River